DWQJ (95.1 FM), broadcasting as DWIZ 95.1, is a radio station owned and operated by Aliw Broadcasting Corporation. Its studios and transmitter are located at Eternal Gardens Compound, Basilica Rd., Brgy. Balatas, Naga, Camarines Sur.

The station was formerly under the Home Radio network from its inception in September 23, 2002 to January 16, 2023. On January 30, 2023, it, along with its provincial stations, was relaunched under the DWIZ network.

References

Aliw Broadcasting Corporation
Home Radio Network
Radio stations in Naga, Camarines Sur
Adult contemporary radio stations in the Philippines
Radio stations established in 2002